Andes to Amazon is a nature documentary TV series co-produced by the BBC Natural History Unit in Bristol, England and Animal Planet, first transmitted in the UK on BBC2 in November 2000. In other territories it was broadcast under the title Wild South America

Each of the six 50-minute episodes portrays a different aspect of the South American continent. The series features extensive aerial photography of major landforms shot by Bob Fulton, and footage of rarely glimpsed animals in the wild. Andes to Amazon was narrated by Fergal Keane and produced by Karen Bass.

The series forms part of the Natural History Unit's Continents strand, and was preceded by Land of the Tiger in 1997 and followed one year later by Congo.

Production
The filmmakers journeyed the length and breath of South America in search of locations and unusual species. Memorable sequences include an aerial journey over a glacier in Argentine Patagonia, jungle animals visiting an Amazon waterhole at night and luminous termite mounds in the grasslands of central Brazil. Other locations featured are the Galápagos Islands and the Salar de Uyuni, the world's biggest salt lake in the Bolivian altiplano.

Filming and post-production took three years in all.

Episodes 
Broadcast dates refer to the original UK transmission.

Merchandise 
A book, soundtrack CD and DVD were all released to accompany the TV series:

 A Region 2 and 4, 2-disc DVD set was released on 18 July 2005 (BBCDVD1707) and features all six full-length episodes along with a bonus 30 minute documentary, Wildlife on One: Giant Otters. Andes to Amazon is one of four series which comprise the Region 1 DVD box set BBC Atlas of the Natural World: Western Hemisphere released on 31 October 2006.
 The accompanying book, Andes to Amazon: A Guide to Wild South America by Michael Bright, was published by BBC Books on 2 November 2000 in a hardcover edition and on 4 April 2002 in a paperback edition.
 On 20 November 2000 a CD was released with a compilation of the incidental music in Andes to Amazon.

See also
BBC Atlas of the Natural World, a 2006-07 compilation series for North America
Tiputini Biodiversity Station – where some of the Amazon scenes were shot.

References

External links 
 
 Andes to Amazon showreel at BBC Motion Gallery
 

BBC television documentaries
Documentary films about nature
2000 British television series debuts
2000 British television series endings
2000 documentary films
Natural history of South America
Geography of South America
English-language television shows